Theodore Walker Cook (April 15, 1921 – May 19, 1990) was an American professional basketball player. He played for several teams in the National Basketball League, each for only a handful of games, and averaged 0.6 points per game. After basketball he became he Director of Recreation in Beckley, West Virginia.

Early life and education
Cook attended Woodrow Wilson High School in Beckley, West Virginia. He served as an officer in the United States Army Reserve and trained military working dogs during World War II.

References

External links

1921 births
1990 deaths
American men's basketball players
Basketball players from West Virginia
Guards (basketball)
Hammond Calumet Buccaneers players
Minneapolis Lakers players
Sportspeople from Beckley, West Virginia
Sheboygan Red Skins players
Tennessee Volunteers basketball players
United States Army officers
United States Army reservists
Woodrow Wilson High School (Beckley, West Virginia) alumni
United States Army personnel of World War II

it:Ted Cook